Orthophytum sucrei is a plant species in the genus Orthophytum.

The bromeliad is endemic to the Atlantic Forest biome (Mata Atlantica Brasileira)  in Bahia state, located in southeastern Brazil.

Cultivars
 Orthophytum 'Starlights'

References

BSI Cultivar Registry Retrieved 11 October 2009

sucrei
Endemic flora of Brazil
Flora of Bahia
Flora of the Atlantic Forest